Nitemazepam (or 3-hydroxynimetazepam) is a benzodiazepine derivative which was first synthesised in the 1970s but was never marketed. It is the 7-nitro instead of 7-chloro analogue of temazepam, and also the 3-hydroxy derivative of nimetazepam, and an active metabolite. It has in more recent years been sold as a designer drug, first being definitively identified in Europe in 2017. It is metabolized to 7-aminonitemazepam, nimetazepam, 3-hydroxynitemazepam, temazepam, and nimetazepam glucuronide.

References

Nitrobenzodiazepines
Designer drugs
GABAA receptor positive allosteric modulators
Lactims